WSHI may refer to:

 WSHI-LP, a radio station (98.5 FM) licensed to Shelbyville, Indiana
 WRDF, a radio station (106.3 FM) licensed to Columbia City, Indiana which held the call sign WSHI from 1997 to 2004